Robot Chicken is an American adult animated stop motion sketch comedy television series, created and executive produced for Adult Swim by Seth Green and Matthew Senreich along with co-head writers Douglas Goldstein and Tom Root. The writers, most prominently Green, also provide many of the voices. Senreich, Goldstein, and Root were formerly writers for the popular action figure hobbyist magazine ToyFare. Robot Chicken has won two Annie Awards and six Emmy Awards.

Production history

Robot Chicken was conceptually preceded by "Twisted ToyFare Theatre", a humorous photo comic strip appearing in ToyFare: The Toy Magazine. Matthew Senreich, an editor for ToyFare, got in touch with actor Seth Green when the former learned that the latter had made action figures of castmates from Buffy the Vampire Slayer and asked to photograph them. Months later, Green asked Senreich to collaborate on an animated short for Late Night with Conan O'Brien, featuring toy versions of himself and O'Brien. This led to the 12-episode stop-motion series Sweet J Presents on the Sony website Screenblast.com in 2001. Conan O'Brien is voiced by Family Guy creator Seth MacFarlane in the first episode ("Conan's Big Fun").

Continuing the concept of the web series, the show creators pitched Robot Chicken as a television series, the name being inspired by a dish on the menu at a West Hollywood Chinese restaurant, Kung Pao Bistro, where Green and Senreich had dined. (Other ideas for the series' name included Junk in the Trunk, The Deep End, and Toyz in the Attic; some of these would be reworked into episode titles for the first season.) Some television networks and sketch shows rejected the series, including Comedy Central, MADtv, Saturday Night Live, and even Cartoon Network. However, someone at that network passed the pitch along to its nighttime programming block, Adult Swim, around the same time that Seth MacFarlane (various voices, 2005–present) told Green and Senreich to pitch the show to the channel. On February 20, 2005, the series premiered on Adult Swim.

The show was created, written, and produced by Green and Senreich and produced by ShadowMachine Films (Seasons 1–5) and Stoopid Buddy Stoodios in association with Stoop!d Monkey, Williams Street, Sony Pictures Digital (Seasons 1–5) and Sony Pictures Television (Seasons 6–10). The show mocks popular culture, referencing toys, movies, television, games, popular fads, and more obscure references like anime cartoons and older television programs, much in the same vein as comedy sketch shows like Saturday Night Live. It employs stop-motion animation of toys, action figures, claymation, and various other objects, such as tongue depressors, The Game of Life pegs, and popsicle sticks. The show's creators were inspired by works such as Monty Python's Flying Circus, Pee-wee's Playhouse and The Kentucky Fried Movie.

One particular motif involves the idea of fantastical characters being placed in a more realistic world or situation (such as Stretch Armstrong requiring a corn syrup transplant after losing his abilities because of aging, Optimus Prime performing a prostate cancer PSA for the humans, and Godzilla having problems in the bedroom). The program aired a 30-minute episode dedicated to Star Wars which premiered June 17, 2007, in the US, featuring the voices of Star Wars notables George Lucas, Mark Hamill (from a previous episode), Billy Dee Williams, and Ahmed Best. The Star Wars episode was nominated for a 2008 Emmy Award as Outstanding Animated Program (for Programming Less Than One Hour).

The series was renewed for a 20-episode third season, which ran from August 12, 2007, to October 5, 2008. After an eight-month hiatus during the third season, the show returned on September 7, 2008, to air the remaining 5 episodes. The series was renewed for a fourth season which premiered on December 7, 2008, and ended on December 6, 2009. In early 2010, the show was renewed for a fifth and sixth season (40 more episodes total). Season five premiered on December 12, 2010. The second group of episodes began broadcasting on October 23, 2011. The 100th episode aired on January 15, 2012. In May 2012, Adult Swim announced they were picking up a sixth season of Robot Chicken, which began airing in September 2012. The seventh season premiered on April 13, 2014. Season eight premiered on October 25, 2015. Season nine premiered on December 10, 2017. Season 10 premiered on September 29, 2019, containing the 200th episode. Season 11 premiered on September 6, 2021. The twelfth season is set to premiere sometime in 2023.

Following the 2020 cancellation of The Venture Bros., it is Adult Swim's longest running series, both in terms of years and episodes.

Format

The sketch series has an iconic opening sequence involving a mad scientist and a chicken set to theme music by Les Claypool of Primus. On a dark and stormy night, the scientist finds a chicken that has been the victim of roadkill, and takes it back to his laboratory to refashion into a cyborg. Midway through the opening sequence, the titular chicken turns his laser eye towards the camera and the title appears, just as Les Claypool cries (a line from Frankenstein), "It's alive!" The Mad Scientist then straps the re-animated Robot Chicken into a chair, uses calipers to hold his eyes open and forces him to watch a grid of television monitors showing different content (akin to imagery from A Clockwork Orange). The sketches are interspersed with static, resembling the act of channel surfing.

While the sketches lampoon various aspects of pop culture quite randomly, they frequently parody DC Comics superheroes as well as many other franchises. Original characters include the Nerd, the Humping Robot, and the show's creators as themselves (often facing potential cancellation at the end of a season), as well as the Mad Scientist and the Robot Chicken.

Alternate opening sequences and related sketches 
In the episode "1987", Michael Ian Black claims in the "Best Robot Chicken Ever" sketch that the opening sequence tells the viewers that they are the chicken, being forced to watch the skits. The frame story of the Robot Chicken and the Mad Scientist would not continue beyond the opening sequence until the 100th episode, entitled "Fight Club Paradise", when the chicken finally makes his escape and later kills the Mad Scientist when he takes his hen wife in response, fighting and killing several characters from previous skits (most of them being implied to be the Mad Scientist's henchmen) in the process.

Beginning in the sixth season (after the events of the show's 100th episode), the opening sequence features a role reversal. The Robot Chicken comes upon the body of the Mad Scientist, which has been decapitated. He turns him into a cyborg with a laser eye (this time blue instead of red, reflected by a title background color change). The chicken then straps the scientist to the same chair he was strapped to and forces him to watch the same TV monitors while the chicken and his wife share a kiss. In the seventh-season episode "Chipotle Miserables", the Mad Scientist's son rips out his father's remaining eye to open a door controlled by an optical biometric reader, then creates a posse of reanimated cyborg animals, as well as a cyborg homeless person. The posse then proceeds to kidnap all five then-living US presidents: Jimmy Carter, George H. W. Bush, Bill Clinton, George W. Bush, and Barack Obama. The Robot Chicken and the now-reformed Mad Scientist team up to rescue the presidents, after which, the Mad Scientist punishes his son by forcing him to watch the TV monitors and the Robot Chicken flies away, free.

Beginning in the eighth season, a new opening sequence features the Robot Chicken frozen in a block of ice under snow, being uncovered by robots. Taken to a futuristic laboratory, the Robot Chicken is taken out of suspended animation by a masked scientist, revealed to be a descendant of the Mad Scientist who first reanimated the Robot Chicken. The descendant mad scientist then proceeds to force the Robot Chicken to watch a wall of projected images with different shows. In an extended version (seen in the Season 8 episode "Garbage Sushi" and the Season 9 episode "3 2 1 2 333, 222, 3...66?"), the sequence begins with a destroyed Statue of Liberty buried in snow (a reference to Planet of the Apes) when two drones are flying together until one scans the frozen Robot Chicken.

In the ninth-season finale, the Nerd dies from a cliff-jump stunt in an attempt to get the show renewed. Beginning in the tenth season, a new opening sequence features the Nerd being turned into a cyborg by both the Robot Chicken and the Mad Scientist and being forced to watch the skits while they high five. The letters "TEN" in the title are highlighted to mark the show reaching ten seasons. In the 200th episode, as the title is shown, David Lynch shouts "Robot Chicken!" in an off-screen voice.

In the eleventh season, a new opening sequence features the Mad Scientist launching the Robot Chicken off a space station in a capsule. The capsule then crashes on the ground where the Robot Chicken meets another cyborg chicken, only in an elderly state (alluding to 2001: A Space Odyssey). The monolith-shaped TVs in the house show a baby Robot Chicken floating through space. Starting with the episode "May Cause a Whole Lotta Scabs", an extended version (set in a 2.39:1 aspect ratio) begins with a tribe of hominids watching the skits on the TVs while a hominid version of the Nerd bites a remote control to turn on the TV monitors. Suddenly, a hominid tries to take the remote, but the hominid Nerd kills it and gets the remote back, segueing into the opening sequence.

Characters
While Robot Chicken uses a variety of notable people and fictional characters in its sketches, it also has original characters created exclusively for the show.
 Robot Chicken (vocal effects provided by Seth Green) – The show's titular character (although his name is only simply as the "Chicken" according to a maid in the 100th episode). He is a cyborg chicken with a red laser eye. First seen as a roadkill chicken on Highway 9W while he originally lived on Old Man McLauchlin's farm, the Mad Scientist revived him as a cyborg and experiments on him by forcing him to watch sketches on numerous TV monitors. In the 100th episode, he gets freed by a maid and later kills his creator after he kidnaps his wife. He later revived the Mad Scientist as a cyborg and reverses the roles, forcing him to watch sketches.
 Cluckerella (vocal effects provided by Seth Green) – The Robot Chicken's wife. She wears a dress and has blonde hair and red lipstick. She gets kidnapped by the Mad Scientist during the 100th episode, causing the Robot Chicken to go to the lab and kill him to rescue her. In the Season 7 finale, it is revealed that Cluckerella has left him.
 The Mad Scientist (voiced by Les Claypool for the laughter and line in the opening and David Lynch for the speaking voice from Season 10 onwards) – A scientist who revived the Robot Chicken. He has wild white hair and a diabolical grin. His real name is revealed to be Fritz Huhnmörder (German for "chicken murderer") in the Season 3 episode "Werewolf vs. Unicorn". He was killed by the Robot Chicken after the events of the 100th episode only for him to be revived as a cyborg in the sixth season's opening sequence, and then gets his revenge by forcing the Mad Scientist to watch the same sketches that he had previously forced the Robot Chicken to watch. In the Season 10 episode "Fila Ogden in: Maggie's Got a Full Load" with the Saturday Night Live-styled opening, the Mad Scientist's nickname is Rick Sanchez, named after another Adult Swim mad scientist character due to his resemblance to the same character. He actually has five kids, in which they include his crazed son, a teenage daughter who is goth, an eight-year-old daughter, and infant twins: a boy named Damien, and a girl named Rhiannon. Additionally, he also has a wife named Kathrine. It also reveals that the Mad Scientist's birthday is on January 21.
 Mad Scientist's Son (voiced by Zachary Levi) – The Mad Scientist's 32-year-old twisted son, who steals his cyborg-making tools as part of a plot to kidnap all living US presidents for ransom. However, he ends up being defeated by the Robot Chicken and the Mad Scientist, who then forces him to watch the sketches as punishment. According to the script of the Season 7 finale, his real name is revealed to be Tony Huhnmörder-Anderson.
 The Nerd (voiced by Seth Green) – A 26-year-old nerdy man (although that's debatable since he still goes to high school and lives with his parents) with square-framed glasses who lisps. He appears in many episodes and often ends up in wild situations in famous media. Although his name was mentioned as "Gary" in the Season 1 episode "Joint Point", recent Adult Swim commercials for some later episodes give his name as "Arthur Kensington, Jr.". He dies in the Season 9 finale only for him to get revived as a cyborg in the tenth season's opening sequence.
 Bitch Pudding (voiced by Katee Sackhoff) – A fictitious addition to the Strawberry Shortcake universe. Bitch Pudding is a foul-mouthed, crass and violent 18-year-old woman and a former resident of Pastryville who has a penchant for insulting, tormenting, and sometimes even killing others. In her debut appearance in the Season 4 episode "P.S. Yes, in That Way", she seems to be 8 years old for early episodes, but in later episodes to show her as a young adult when she gets a growth spurt. In Season 7, she became the first of the series' recurring characters to have their own first single storyline special, titled the "Bitch Pudding Special".
 Unicorn (voiced by George Lowe) – A white homosexual unicorn who is a complete pervert. In his debut appearance in the Season 2 episode "Suck It", he appears before the Nerd, who had just daydreamed about unicorns being real. When his magic horn is polished, it gives "magical unicorn mayonnaise".
 Mo-Larr: Eternian Dentist (voiced by Michael Ian Black) – A fictional addition to the cast for the show's Masters of the Universe parodies. Mo-Larr is the resident dentist of Eternia. He is willing to resort to drastic measures in order to perform his dental work on unwilling patients such as Skeletor, even going so far as to ensnare Beast Man in dental floss and stick a dental drill into Grizzlor's eye. His real name is revealed to be Moe Larrstein in the Season 5 episode "Terms of Endaredevil".
 Composite Santa Claus (voiced by Christian Slater) – A genocidal monster who is half Santa Claus, half snowman, and is based on Composite Superman. In the Season 4 episode "In a DVD Factory", his backstory is revealed: he has been created by a diabolical scientist from the combined DNA of Santa and Frosty the Snowman. After he awakens, he shoots the scientist and his two assistants with an automatic rifle, killing the latter two, and goes on a rampage, waging war on all non-Gentile religions.
 Little Drummer Boy (voiced by Seth Green) – An anime-style drummer whose drums can summon demons when beaten.
 Humping Robot – A mute robot looking for love, who is first seen humping a washing machine in the Season 1 episode "Atta Toy". He has also been seen humping church bells, jukeboxes, and slot machines, among other metallic objects. In the Season 3 episode "Werewolf vs. Unicorn", he is revealed to be a father of his unknown robotic family, according to the gravestone of him.
 Sunshine Cowboy – A mute cowboy in a summer vacation outfit that is shot every time he appears on screen.
 Pablo Rodríguez – A mute Mexican test pilot who was rebuilt into a cyborg after he hit a cactus while riding a donkey in Mexico and made a dynamic leap over a border fence. He is nicknamed "The Six Million Peso Man", a parody of The Six Million Dollar Man.
 MC Broccoli (voiced by Breckin Meyer) – An anthropomorphic broccoli who is a rapper.
 Daniel a.k.a. "Gyro-Robo" (voiced by Seth Green) – A negative-minded teenage nerd who hosts a web series (entitled the "Gyro-Robo News Hour") where he complains about inaccuracies in media – and not even Robot Chicken is immune from his criticism. He masturbates frequently and is often targeted by the local bully, Munson.
 Munson (voiced by Breckin Meyer) – A jerkish teenager who bullies nerds, especially Daniel.
 Gary the Stormtrooper (voiced by Donald Faison) – A fictional addition to the cast for the show's Star Wars parodies. Gary is a clumsy, bit incompetent and well-meaning 29-year-old stormtrooper who usually messes things up due to his clumsiness. Despite that, he is able to make his work right. In the special Robot Chicken: Star Wars Episode II, he is revealed to be a married family man who lives with his wife Beverly (voiced by Rachael Leigh Cook) and his young daughter Jessica (voiced by Adrianne Palicki), who according to his wife, hardly ever sees him due to his work; but is making efforts to be involved more in her life. In the special Robot Chicken: Star Wars Episode III, he also revealed that his family live on Alderaan.
 Aliens (voiced by Seth Green, Breckin Meyer, Adam Talbott, Mark Hamill, Patrick Pinney, and Patrick Stewart) – A race of wacky grey aliens who have a tendency to bungle their plans and efforts, usually resulting in them letting out a frustrated scream of "Dammit, dammit, dammit!".
 Bloopers Host (voiced by Jamie Kaler) – The host of the "Bloopers!" sketches, which parodies the early years of America's Funniest Home Videos, substituting home videos for humorous television and film outtakes (although home videos have been shown on two occasions, the latter of which are from his own life). At the end of almost every sketch he appears in, he commits suicide in various ways, including hanging himself, swallowing whiskey and pills, putting a toaster in a bathtub, and suffocating himself with a plastic bag.
 Gummy Bear (voiced by Michelle Trachtenberg) – An anthropomorphic gummy bear who is doomed to scream in pain from stepping on a bear trap. In her debut appearance in the Season 3 episode "Tapping a Hero", she doesn't mind the taste of her own leg after she bites it off to free herself only to step on another bear trap again.

Episodes

Voice cast
Besides the celebrities and many famous voice actors that have contributed to this show, main and major recurring actors/writers are:

 Jordan Allen-Dutton
 Candace Bailey
 Carlee Baker
 Abraham Benrubi
 Rachel Bloom
 Alex Borstein
 Leah Ann Cevoli
 Rachael Leigh Cook
 Dave Coulier
 Macaulay Culkin
 Hugh Davidson
 Mikey Day
 Deirdre Devlin
 Madison Dylan
 Eden Espinosa
 Donald Faison
 Mike Fasolo
 Lynn Favin
 Keith Ferguson
 Shelby Fero
 Nathan Fillion
 Tamara Garfield
 Sarah Michelle Gellar
 Doug Goldstein
 Ginnifer Goodwin
 Melissa Goodwin Shepherd
 Clare Grant
 Seth Green
 Jim Hanks
 Jamie Kaler
 Mila Kunis
 Jordan Ladd
 Matthew Lillard
 Jamie Loftus
 Whitney Loveall
 George Lowe
 Seth MacFarlane
 Rachael MacFarlane
 Harmony McElligott
 Breckin Meyer
 Dan Milano
 Chad Morgan
 Adrianne Palicki
 Patrick Pinney
 Tom Root
 Katee Sackhoff
 Matthew Senreich
 Mehar Sethi
 Tom Sheppard
 Kevin Shinick
 Amy Smart
 Adam Talbott
 Fred Tatasciore
 Erik Weiner
 Zeb Wells
 Victor Yerrid

Syndication
All Robot Chicken episodes from seasons 1-11 are available on HBO Max. The show is streamed censored on the service until Season 5.

Home media

Revolver Entertainment have released the first four seasons and all three Star Wars specials on DVD in the United Kingdom. A box set including the first 3 seasons and a box set including all three Star Wars specials have also been released.

Madman Entertainment has released the first 9 seasons of Robot Chicken and specials on DVD in Australia and New Zealand.

International broadcast
The series airs in the United Kingdom and Ireland as part of E4's Adult Swim block, in Canada on Adult Swim (previously Teletoon's Teletoon at Night block from 2006 to 2019) and also in Quebec on Télétoon's Télétoon la nuit block, in Australia on The Comedy Channel's Adult Swim block, in Russia on 2x2's Adult Swim block, in Germany on WarnerTV Comedy's Adult Swim block (previously TNT Serie's Adult Swim block from 2009 to 2017), and in Latin America on the I.Sat Adult Swim block (after the Adult Swim block was canceled from Cartoon Network Latin America in 2008). Many of the show's sketches from Sweet J Presents were redone for Robot Chicken.

References

External links

 
 
 
 Robot Chicken – Star Wars Review at Variety.com

 
2000s American adult animated television series
2000s American black comedy television series
2000s American sketch comedy television series
2000s American variety television series
2005 American television series debuts
2010s American adult animated television series
2010s American black comedy television series
2010s American sketch comedy television series
2010s American variety television series
2020s American adult animated television series
2020s American black comedy television series
2020s American sketch comedy television series
2020s American variety television series
American adult animated adventure television series
American adult animated comedy television series
American animated variety television series
American stop-motion adult animated television series
American television shows featuring puppetry
Crossover animated television series
English-language television shows
Emmy Award-winning programs
Adult Swim original programming
Television series by ShadowMachine
Television series by Sony Pictures Television
Television series by Williams Street
Television series by Stoopid Buddy Stoodios
Television series created by Matthew Senreich
Works by Geoff Johns